Supermanoela is a Brazilian telenovela produced and broadcast by TV Globo. It premiered on 21 January 1974 and ended on 5 June 1974, with a total of 137 episodes. It is the thirteenth "novela das sete" to be aired at the timeslot. It was created by Walther Negrão and directed by Gonzaga Blota.

Cast

References

External links 
 

1974 telenovelas
TV Globo telenovelas
Brazilian telenovelas
1974 Brazilian television series debuts
1974 Brazilian television series endings
Portuguese-language telenovelas